Litsea dilleniifolia is a species of plant in the family Lauraceae. It is endemic to China.  It is threatened by habitat loss.

References

dilleniifolia
Endemic flora of China
Endangered flora of Asia
Taxonomy articles created by Polbot